Andreas Ridder (born 27 September 1964) is a retired German football defender.

References

External links
 

1964 births
Living people
People from Warendorf
Sportspeople from Münster (region)
German footballers
Footballers from North Rhine-Westphalia
Association football defenders
Bundesliga players
2. Bundesliga players
Arminia Bielefeld players
VfL Bochum players
20th-century German people